Biofuels, Bioproducts and Biorefining is a bimonthly peer-reviewed review and commentary journal published by John Wiley & Sons on behalf of the Society of Chemical Industry. The journal was established in 2007 and the editor in chief is Bruce E. Dale. According to the Journal Citation Reports, the journal's 2020 impact factor is 4.102.

References

External links 
 

Wiley (publisher) academic journals
Biotechnology journals
Bimonthly journals
Chemical industry in the United Kingdom
Publications established in 2007
English-language journals